The Blip (also known as the Decimation and the Snap) is a major fictional event depicted in the Marvel Cinematic Universe (MCU) franchise in which half of all living things in the universe, chosen at random, were exterminated by Thanos snapping his fingers while wielding the Infinity Stones in 2018, and then restored in late 2023 by Bruce Banner using Infinity Stones recovered from different time periods. "The Blip" appears to refer to the entire event, including the elimination and restoration of the victims. The Blip manifested in the form of the mass disintegration of individual beings into dust, while the reversal had the same dust reforming into the previously deceased individuals, who mostly reappeared in the same location with no direct awareness of what occurred.

, aspects of the Blip have been featured in Phase Three, Four, and Five of the MCU across various media, including Avengers: Infinity War (the first depiction) (2018), Ant-Man and the Wasp (post-credits) (2018), Captain Marvel (post-credits) (2019), Avengers: Endgame (2019), Spider-Man: Far From Home (2019), WandaVision (2021), The Falcon and the Winter Soldier (2021), Hawkeye (2021), and Ant-Man and the Wasp: Quantumania (2023).

The consequences of the Blip were substantial and far-reaching. Some were portrayed for comic effects, such as "blipped" school band members reappearing in the middle of a basketball game, and "blipped" characters now being years younger than their own "unblipped" previously younger siblings. Others were portrayed for dramatic effect, such as blipped characters returning to general chaos and confusion, finding that loved ones had died in their absence, their homes and life savings were repossessed, and their jobs had been filled by others. Marvel Studios president Kevin Feige viewed the inclusion of the Blip as a major crux in the MCU timeline, similar to how the Battle of New York in the third act of The Avengers would go on to be referenced as a pivotal event in multiple MCU media.

The Blip inspired the creation of a real-world event on the website Reddit, in which a randomly-selected half of the members of a highly popular subreddit would be banned, simulating the effects of the Blip. The ban of over 300,000 accounts, which included Avengers: Infinity War co-director Anthony Russo, was the largest in Reddit's history. The Blip, as an event within the MCU, has been compared to the COVID-19 pandemic in the real world, as an event that has a sustained effect on people all over the world.

Etymology 
Following the release of Avengers: Infinity War, the event was dubbed by fans as "the Snap", "the Snappening", or "the Snapture". In the tie-in novel Marvel's Avengers: Infinity War: The Cosmic Quest Volume Two: Aftermath by Brandon T. Snider, the event was referred to as "the Decimation", but this naming was not used in any other related media. The event was referred to as "the Blip" in Spider-Man: Far From Home, but Kevin Feige later clarified that "the Snap" referred to Thanos' finger snap in Avengers: Infinity War while "the Blip" referred to Bruce Banner's finger snap in Avengers: Endgame. Despite Feige's comments, both events were collectively referred to as "the Blip" in WandaVision and The Falcon and the Winter Soldier, and the term also appears to reference the five-year gap between the two snaps during which half of Earth's population were wiped from existence.

Known victims and survivors

Victims 
The Blip wiped out 50% of all living creatures. Memorials to the "vanished" victims were erected in communities across the universe. Among the victims were:

Survivors 
Those known to have survived the Blip include:

 Ajak
 Bruce Banner
 Clint Barton
 Kate Bishop
 Sharon Carter
 Carol Danvers
 Brad Davis
 Druig
 Wilson Fisk
 Gilgamesh
 Roger Harrington
 Tyler Hayward
 Happy Hogan
 Howard the Duck
 Ikaris
 Kingo
 Korg
 Cassie Lang
 Scott Lang
 Maya Lopez
 William Lopez
 Makkari
 M'Baku
 Miek
 Nakia
 Karli Morgenthau
 Nebula
 Okoye
 Christine Palmer
 Phastos
 Pepper Potts
 Maria Rambeau
 Ramonda
 James Rhodes
 Rocket
 Steve Rogers
 Natasha Romanoff
 Sersi
 Sprite
 Tony Stark
 Marc Spector
 Toussaint / T'Challa II
 Thanos
 Thena
 Thor
 Valkyrie
 Wong

Scott Lang was in the Quantum Realm at the time of the snap, and although only a few hours passed there from his perspective; when he escaped from the Quantum Realm, because time passes slower there, five years had passed everywhere else. However, Lang was believed to have been a victim, due to his absence over those five years. The Eternals also survived the Blip due to them being artificial and not biological beings.

Depictions

Films 
In Avengers: Infinity War, Thanos obtains the six Infinity Stones and places them within a gauntlet built by Eitri, so that he can snap his fingers and eliminate half of all life in the universe, which he believes will bring a balance that will prevent greater catastrophes from fighting over resources.

The Blip occurs at the end of the film in Wakanda, where numerous characters are blipped, including Bucky Barnes, Nick Fury, Maria Hill, Wanda Maximoff, Peter Parker, Stephen Strange, T'Challa, Sam Wilson, Peter Quill, Groot, Drax and Mantis. The Russo brothers also revealed that, despite not appearing in Infinity War, Betty Ross and Sif were blipped as well.

In a mid-credits scene in Ant-Man and the Wasp, Hank Pym, Hope van Dyne, and Janet Van Dyne are blipped, leaving Scott Lang stranded in the Quantum Realm. In a subsequent post-credits scene, a nationwide broadcast of the Emergency Alert System is shown on a television in Lang's home. In a post-credits scene of Captain Marvel, the Avengers are surveying reports of worldwide population losses at the Avengers compound, when Carol Danvers abruptly appears, having received a distress signal from Fury that he sent through a pager before he blipped.

In Avengers: Endgame, Clint Barton's family, Erik Selvig, Shuri and Jane Foster are confirmed to have been blipped. In the Avengers' compound, Scott Lang and Sharon Carter are also listed as blipped, though Lang was unaccounted for due to being trapped in the Quantum Realm, and Carter went rogue to establish her identity as the Power Broker in Madripoor.

Some of the surviving heroes travel to the planet to which Thanos has retired to attempt to recover the Infinity Stones and undo the Blip, only to learn that Thanos had destroyed the Stones to ensure that the Blip cannot be undone.

Five years later, the effects of the disappearances are explored, with many characters having experiences resulting from the event. For example, Barton is distraught at the loss of his family, and becomes a rogue warrior, travelling the world to massacre organized crime figures involved in the drug trade and child trafficking. Steve Rogers leads a support group for those dealing with the loss of loved ones in the Blip. Thor, who blames himself for failing to kill Thanos before the initial snap, becomes an out-of-shape alcoholic. Urban decay is apparent in cities such as New York City and San Francisco. Carol Danvers tells the Avengers that the chaos happening on Earth is also occurring on other planets throughout the cosmos.

In the meantime, Scott Lang is freed from the Quantum Realm, having only experienced five hours instead of years. He comes across a memorial park listing names of the vanished, including his own name, then reunites with his daughter Cassie, who had been a young girl when he last saw her and is now a teenager. Lang informs the remaining Avengers and allies about his discovery: the Quantum Realm can allow time travel. While they soon determine that the nature of time travel means that they cannot simply go back in time and stop Thanos from either causing the Blip or destroying the Stones in the first place, they are able to use Pym Particles to travel through the Quantum Realm to retrieve the Infinity Stones from alternate timelines in the past.

Upon returning to the present, Tony Stark, Bruce Banner and Rocket develop a gauntlet composed of Stark's nanotech that is capable of harnessing the power of the Stones. Due to the powerful emission of gamma radiation resulting from the Stones' use, Banner volunteers to wear the gauntlet, and successfully restores the blipped victims in the condition they had vanished. The Avengers are then attacked by an alternate version of Thanos who intends to destroy and recreate the universe. A final battle ensues, during which the Avengers attempt to return the Stones to their own timelines, only for Thanos to thwart their efforts. Stark ultimately wins the battle by using the Stones to destroy Thanos and his army for good at the cost of his own life.

Following a funeral honoring Stark's sacrifice, Rogers travels back in time to return the Stones to their original time periods, and decides to return to his own time to live the life with Peggy Carter he'd always wanted. As an elderly man, he appears on the Avengers campus to pass the shield and mantle of Captain America to Sam Wilson.

In Spider-Man: Far From Home, the Blip is discussed in a school news broadcast at the beginning of the film, which is the first instance in any medium of the name. The broadcast shows Midtown School of Science and Technology band members reappearing in the middle of a basketball game. The film reveals that several more characters had been blipped and restored, including Peter's aunt May Parker, and his classmates Ned Leeds, MJ, Betty Brant, and Flash Thompson. Parker's teacher Roger Harrington complains that his wife had pretended to have been blipped in order to leave him.

As part of a viral marketing campaign to promote the home media release of Far From Home, a real version of the fictional TheDailyBugle.net website was created that featured testimonials from supposed victims of the Blip, including one complaining that they disappeared in a dangerous situation and were seriously injured when they reappeared. This contradicted a statement by Feige saying that anyone in such a situation would have reappeared safely. Several days after this was pointed out, the website was updated to say this story was faked for an insurance claim.

In Shang-Chi and the Legend of the Ten Rings, the Blip is discussed and fliers can be seen in San Francisco regarding a hotline for sufferers of "post-Blip anxiety".

In Eternals, Ajak reveals that the Blip delayed the onslaught of the Emergence for five years, as it halved the Earth's population from the necessary level needed for the Emergence to occur. An advertisement for the Global Repatriation Council (GRC) is seen.

In Spider-Man: No Way Home, it is revealed that Wong replaced Stephen Strange as the Sorcerer Supreme due to Strange's disappearance for five years in the Blip. In a mid-credits scene, a bartender explains to a universe-displaced Eddie Brock how his family was among the victims of the Blip.

In Doctor Strange in the Multiverse of Madness, it is revealed that Strange’s former girlfriend Dr. Christine Palmer survived the Blip and found love with another man during that time whom she marries at the start of the film. During the wedding, Strange also learns that his former coworker Dr. Nicodemus West was blipped, and when he returned five years later, he was devastated to discover that his brother and cats had died during his absence. This compels West to ask Strange if there was any way that Thanos could have been defeated without the Blip occurring, prompting Strange to confirm that there was no other way.

In Black Panther: Wakanda Forever, it is revealed that Nakia and her son Toussaint left Wakanda immediately following the Blip, and Ramonda served as Queen regnant of Wakanda during the subsequent five years. Having been out of existence for five years also matured Shuri and made her more hardened as a result.

In Guardians of the Galaxy Holiday Special and Guardians of the Galaxy Vol. 3, the Guardians of the Galaxy purchase Knowhere from the Collector in an attempt to make it a safe haven for refugees displaced by the Blip.

In Ant-Man and the Wasp: Quantumania, it is revealed that Hope van Dyne founded The Pym-Van Dyne Foundation to help the world using Pym Particles in the aftermath of the Blip, by providing reforestation and other humanitarian efforts. Cassie Lang also tried to assist with activism in helping a settlement of people who had lost their homes due to the Blip-displacement.

Television series 
When asked how the sixth season of Agents of S.H.I.E.L.D., set one year after the events of the fifth season and Avengers: Infinity War, would connect to the then-upcoming Avengers: Endgame, Marvel Television head Jeph Loeb suggested in March 2019 that the one year time jump between the previous season of the series and this one was part of the series' tie-in to that film. After Endgame was released in April, the showrunners and Loeb revealed that the series would not directly depict or reference the Blip for several reasons: they began production on the season without knowing all of Endgames plot or how Spider-Man: Far From Home (2019) would be depicting a post-Endgame MCU; they were unsure when the season would be released in relation to Endgame and how much they would be allowed to reveal if they had begun airing before the film was released; and they wanted to focus on telling their own story rather than be "shackled too much to the universe-changing events from the films". While acknowledging that this meant the series seemingly no longer lined-up with the films' timeline, producer Jed Whedon stated that the writers had an explanation for this that made sense to them even though they did not plan to "burden the audience" with it. A line referencing the Blip and how the Quantum Realm could be used to avoid it was filmed for the series finale at the end of its seventh season, but was ultimately cut from the aired episode.

At the beginning of the fourth episode of WandaVision, "We Interrupt This Program", Monica Rambeau is shown returning from being blipped in a hospital room, discovering chaos outside as other people are un-blipped in many places, and learning that her mother Maria had died of cancer while she was gone. In the same episode, when characters outside the Westview hex first see Vision onscreen, three weeks after the event, Darcy Lewis asks her colleagues to confirm that "he's dead, right? Not blipped. Dead". The writers and producers had many conversations about how to portray people returning from the Blip, and decided to set the sequence in a hospital as an interesting place to depict the scariness and confusion of the event from Monica's perspective. This is different from the portrayal of the Blip in Far From Home, which had a more comedic tone, and Schaeffer explained that Marvel was happy for the series' tone to be different as long as the visuals of the sequence matched with those seen in Far From Home.

In The Falcon and the Winter Soldier, set six months after the event, the Blip is referenced as having created chaos around the world. Millions of people who were displaced by the Blip came under the authority of the Global Repatriation Council (GRC), with a substantial number of people living as refugees awaiting repatriation to their home countries. Many express thankfulness to the Avengers for reversing the Blip but the event also caused violent revolutions throughout the world by organizations such as the Flag Smashers, who felt that life was better during the Blip and engage in terrorist activities to promote an anarchist society. On Sharon Carter surviving the Blip and becoming the Power Broker, series director Kari Skogland said that Carter "had to survive out there on her own during the Blip and being on the run without family — and look at what she built and where she went. She's clever, and that's what I love about it most."

In Hawkeye, set one year after the Blip, the phrase "Thanos was right" is seen on a coffee mug and in graffiti in New York City. The event is mentioned by Kate Bishop when she deduces that Clint Barton was the Ronin. In the series it is also shown that Yelena Belova / Black Widow was also blipped and that Maya Lopez / Echo and her father, William, survived the Blip, only for William to later die in an attack facilitated by their employer, Wilson Fisk / Kingpin. Hawkeye episode five, "Ronin", was the first MCU media to show the Blip from the perspective of a person being blipped, with Belova seeming to almost instantly disintegrate and then reappear, with the room around her changing in appearance to signify the sudden passage of five years.

Although the Blip is never mentioned in Moon Knight, the issue date on Marc Spector’s passport is visibly shown to be December 14, 2018 (a post-Blip date), indicating that he survived the Blip. In addition, a Global Repatriation Council (GRC) banner is seen on the side of a bus. The series' head writer Jeremy Slater later confirmed Spector's survival.

The Blip is not shown to occur in the alternate universes depicted in episodes of the TV series What If...?. In one alternate universe, T'Challa convinces Thanos to abandon his plans of erasing half of life in the universe. In another alternate universe, Thanos arrives on Earth, having acquired most of the Infinity Stones, but is infected by the quantum virus and transformed into a zombie. In another alternate universe, Thanos arrives on Earth to retrieve the Mind Stone after collecting the other Infinity Stones, but is swiftly killed by Ultron, who takes the Stones for himself and sets about to kill all life in the Multiverse.

In She-Hulk: Attorney at Law, Bruce Banner takes his cousin Jennifer Walters to his beach house/lab in Mexico built by Banner and Stark, and explains to Walters that "this is where I spent the Blip fixing myself and integrating the Hulk/Banner identities". The conversation does not clarify whether Walters herself was blipped. In the second episode, Walters' mother, Elaine, reminds the family that Banner was responsible for the Blip and that he had saved everyone with a snap of his finger.

Differences from the comics 

In the comic books published by Marvel Comics, the event on which the initial part of the Blip is based occurred during the 1991 The Infinity Gauntlet series, and came to be called the Snap. While still carried out by Thanos, it was done in an effort to impress the personification of Death, with whom he was enamored. Thanos collects the Infinity Gems, which he uses to create the Infinity Gauntlet, making himself omnipotent, and erases half the living things in the universe to prove his love to Death. The heroes of Earth and other worlds do not become aware of these events until the Snap itself occurs, after which the surviving heroes band together against Thanos. The Snap and several related acts are quickly undone by Nebula and Adam Warlock. Warlock reveals that Thanos has always allowed himself to be defeated because the Titan secretly knows he is not worthy of ultimate power. Thanos then joins Warlock as part of the Infinity Watch and helps him to defeat various threats to the universe. Because the Snap is reversed shortly after it occurs, it does not have the sort of long-term societal effects and repercussions as the Blip in the MCU. Furthermore, because the Infinity Gems are recovered from Thanos immediately, and are never destroyed, they continue to play a role in later storylines in the comic books.

Reception 
The introduction of the Blip drew positive reviews from critics and audiences as an effective plot device due to its use as a plot twist in Infinity War, serious tone, and overarching implications in the MCU.

The depiction of the Blip at the conclusion of Avengers: Infinity War sparked various Internet meme reactions, including one referencing Peter Parker saying he does not feel good as he disintegrates, which was applied to other things.

The website, DidThanosKill.Me was created for fans to see if they would have been spared by Thanos or not. The ending also spawned the creation of the Reddit subreddit, r/thanosdidnothingwrong. A user within the subreddit suggested that half of the approximately 20,000 subscribers at the time be banned from the subreddit, in order to mimic the events of the film. After the community agreed to the measure, the moderators approached Reddit's administrators to see if the mass ban would even be possible. Once the administrators agreed to the random ban of half the subscribers, it was set to occur on July 9, 2018. Notice of the impending ban made the subreddit's subscribers increase to over 700,000, including both of the Russos who subscribed. Ahead of the ban, Brolin posted a video saying "Here we go, Reddit users," and ending it with a snap. Over 60,000 people watched a live Twitch stream of the ban occurring, which lasted several hours. The ban of over 300,000 accounts, which included Anthony Russo, was the largest in Reddit's history. Those banned then gathered in the new subreddit, /r/inthesoulstone. One Reddit user who participated described the ban as embodying "the spirit of the Internet" with people "banding together, en masse, around something relatively meaningless but somehow decidedly awesome and hilarious". Andrew Tigani of Screen Rant said this showed "how impactful the film has already become to pop culture. It is also a testament to how valuable fan interaction can be via social media".

Feige has noted similar connotations and societal ramifications apparent between the fictional Blip and the worldwide COVID-19 pandemic in 2020, which followed the release of Avengers: Endgame. Feige elaborated, "As we started getting into a global pandemic last March and April and May, we started to go, holy mackerel, the Blip, this universal experience...this experience that affected every human on Earth, now has a direct parallel between what people who live in the MCU had encountered, and what all of us in the real world have encountered."

Following the premiere of Avengers: Endgame, Google included a clickable icon of the Infinity Gauntlet in Google Search results for "Thanos" or "Infinity Gauntlet" as a digital Easter egg. The icon, when clicked, made a finger-snapping motion before half of the search results disappeared, akin to the disappearance of characters following the Blip. The disappearance of the search results could also be reversed, shown by the use of the Time Stone in the Infinity Gauntlet icon.

While promoting Eternals, actor Kit Harington suggested that Marvel fans "mustn't get too bogged down" in the Blip, stating: "If it becomes too much about the Blip or events that happened in the previous stuff, you can trip yourself up everywhere".

Scientific analysis and accuracy 
The motivations held by Thanos that led to the Blip have drawn comparisons by experts to claims and works held by 18th-century scholar and economist Thomas Malthus. In 1798, Malthus theorized in An Essay on the Principle of Population, that if populations grew much faster than their food sources, and if growth remained unchecked, it would eventually lead to societal collapse. Malthus had argued that society could impose a preventative check on unrestrained growth, thereby avoiding catastrophic outcomes.

While the event wipes out half of the universe's population and not necessarily half of Earth's, modern scientific experts have commented that, in a hypothetical real-world scenario, a reduction of half of all forms of biological life on Earth would have immediate effects on biodiversity, comparable to a mass extinction event. Threatened species with preexisting low populations, as well as those species involved in pollination and food production services that require pollination management would be adversely affected. Ecosystem collapse could be possible. In relation to humans, a decrease of human overpopulation would lead to fewer emissions of greenhouse gases, which would improve the prospects of climate change mitigation and reduce global warming and its related effects. A simultaneous mass disappearance of people would also immediately trigger a substantial number of accidental and circumstantial deaths, such as airplane crashes and vehicular accidents.

A study in 2021 found that Thanos could not have physically snapped his fingers while wearing the Infinity Gauntlet due to the lack of friction between surfaces.

See also 
 Malthusianism
 The Population Bomb, a 1968 book by Paul R. Ehrlich that inaccurately predicted worldwide famine due to overpopulation, as well as other major societal upheavals

Notes

References

External links 
 The Snap at the Marvel Cinematic Universe Wiki
 The Blip at the Marvel Cinematic Universe Wiki

Avengers (film series)
Fictional events
Genocide in fiction
Marvel Cinematic Universe features
Post-apocalyptic fiction
Film and television memes
Internet memes introduced in 2018
Fictional elements introduced in 2018